Sealed Lips is a 1925 American silent drama film directed by Tony Gaudio and starring Dorothy Revier, Cullen Landis, and Lincoln Stedman.

Plot
As described in a film magazine review, a young man who believes his fiancé’s dying father, a gambler, is his rival, breaks with the young woman. She tries to prove her innocence, but is not united with the young man until after she saves his sister from a villainous wooer.

Cast

References

Bibliography

External links

1925 drama films
1920s English-language films
American silent feature films
Silent American drama films
American black-and-white films
Columbia Pictures films
1920s American films
English-language drama films